Combee Settlement is a census-designated place and unincorporated area in Polk County, Florida, United States. The population was 5,436 at the 2000 census. It is part of the Lakeland–Winter Haven Metropolitan Statistical Area. The area includes the separate unincorporated community of Country Club Estates.

ZIP code 
The ZIP code for Combee Settlement is 33801.

Geography
Combee Settlement is located at  (28.058007, -81.909473); or about 3 miles ENE of Lakeland.

According to the United States Census Bureau, the CDP has a total area of 5.5 km (2.1 mi²), all land.

Demographics

At the 2000 census there were 5,436 people, 2,193 households, and 1,429 families in the CDP.  The population density was 990.0/km (2,563.3/mi²).  There were 2,488 housing units at an average density of 453.1/km (1,173.2/mi²).  The racial makeup of the CDP was 87.91% White, 5.72% African American, 0.88% Native American, 0.64% Asian, 0.04% Pacific Islander, 2.92% from other races, and 1.88% from two or more races. Hispanic or Latino of any race were 6.40%.

Of the 2,193 households 28.5% had children under the age of 18 living with them, 45.2% were married couples living together, 13.8% had a female householder with no husband present, and 34.8% were non-families. 26.8% of households were one person and 9.7% were one person aged 65 or older.  The average household size was 2.48 and the average family size was 2.97.

The age distribution was 24.6% under the age of 18, 8.8% from 18 to 24, 29.8% from 25 to 44, 23.4% from 45 to 64, and 13.4% 65 or older.  The median age was 36 years. For every 100 females, there were 100.7 males.  For every 100 females age 18 and over, there were 97.7 males.

The median household income was $30,923 and the median family income  was $35,532. Males had a median income of $26,523 versus $21,267 for females. The per capita income for the CDP was $14,461.  About 14.4% of families and 19.5% of the population were below the poverty line, including 22.9% of those under age 18 and 12.8% of those age 65 or over.

In 2010 Combee Settlement had a population of 5,577.  The racial and ethnic makeup of the population was 69.8% non-Hispanic white, 9.2% black or African American, 0.8% Native American, 0.7% Asian, 0.2% non-Hispanic reporting some other race, 3.0% reporting two or more races and 18.2% Hispanic or Latino.

References

Census-designated places in Polk County, Florida
Census-designated places in Florida